The North West Shelf Venture, situated in the north-west of Western Australia, is Australia's largest resource development project. It involves the extraction of petroleum (mostly natural gas and condensate) at offshore production platforms, onshore processing and export of liquefied natural gas, and production of natural gas for industrial, commercial and domestic use within the state.

Project
With investments totalling $25 billion since the early 1980s, the project is the largest resource development in Australian history. In the late 1980s, it was the largest engineering project in the world.

It is owned by a joint venture of six partners  BHP, BP, Chevron, Shell, Woodside Petroleum and a 50:50 joint venture between Mitsubishi and Mitsui & Co  with each holding an equal one-sixth shareholding. Along with being a joint venture partner, Woodside is the project operator on behalf of the other participants.

Assets
The venture currently has three currently active offshore facilities. A fourth, North Rankin B is under construction:

 North Rankin A (NRA)
Modifications have increased the facility's capacity by 50% and it remains one of the world's largest gas platforms.
It is located 135 km north-west of Karratha and can accommodate more than 120 people. It services 25 production wells in the North Rankin and Perseus fields.

 Goodwyn A (GWA)
At a cost of $2bn, the platform was, when commissioned in early 1995, the largest single offshore oil and gas investment ever made in Australia.
In late 2001, the Goodwyn platform was linked to the Echo/Yodel gas and condensate fields via a 23 km  pipeline.  Hydrocarbons from the Goodwyn field are transferred via a subsea pipeline to North Rankin before being transported to Karratha for processing.  It is designed for up to 30 production wells (19 currently), including five re-injection wells. It accommodates 137 people.
It has a production capacity of 32,000 tonnes of gas per day.

 Cossack Pioneer Floating Production Storage and Off-Loading (FPSO)
Located 34 km east of the North Rankin A platform, it is moored to a riser turret which is connected by flexible flowlines to subsea production wells at the Wanaea, Cossack, Lambert and Hermeson gas fields.
In May 2008, Woodside announced plans to replace the 13-year-old vessel with a view to extending oil output to 2025-2030.

The condensate is transported to the Burrup Peninsula (Murujuga) onshore facility on the mainland 130 km away by two  and  undersea pipes.

Other assets include:
 LNG and condensate loading facilities at Withnell Bay at Karratha including jetties, LNG storage tanks and other infrastructure, and supported by Dampier Port Authority.

 Karratha gas plant. In 2008, the facility capacity was increased to 16.3 million tonnes per year with the commissioning of a fifth, 4.4 million tonnes per year LNG production train.  As well as processing gas for export, the facility supplies domestic supplies to consumers and businesses in Western Australia.  The facility also processes condensate which is extracted from the gaseous hydrocarbons during processing.
 A fleet of nine purpose built LNG cargo ships.  The ships are powered using gas vapour from the storage tanks on board which is used to run steam turbines.  Each of the ships is equipped with four spherical tanks giving a total capacity of 125,000 cubic metres (138,500 cubic metres in the case of the most recently delivered Northwest Swan) and utilise docking facilities at the Karratha gas plant's Withnell Bay terminal. A subsidiary company, North West Shelf Shipping Service Company Pty Ltd manages the shipping operations.

In March 2008, the partners approved a A$5 billion North Rankin 2 project which will underpin supply commitments to customers in Asia beyond 2013.  The project will recover remaining low pressure gas from the ageing North Rankin and Perseus gas fields using compression. It will include the installation of a new platform (North Rankin B) which will stand in about 125 metres of water and will be connected by a 100-metre bridge to the existing North Rankin A platform.

Production and sales

The first LNG shipments went to Japan in 1989. Two hundred shipments per year (about one shipment every 1.5 days) in the purpose built LNG carriers totalling more than seven million tons are made around the world.  Markets include sales to long term customers in Japan and spot buyers in China, Spain, South Korea and the United States.

To date, the venture has produced more than 1000 cargoes of light crude oil (natural gas condensate). Condensate is sold on the international energy market.

In 2002, a contract was signed to supply 3 million tonnes of LNG a year from the North West Shelf Venture to China. The contract was worth $25 billion: between $700 million and $1 billion a year for 25 years. The price was guaranteed not to increase until 2031, and, as international LNG prices were increasing, by 2015 China was paying one-third as were Australian consumers. 

The venture is Western Australia's largest single producer of domestic gas providing about 65% of total State production. Pipeline gas is processed at the consortium's Karratha facility, and transported to customers in southern Western Australia via the 1530 km Dampier to Bunbury Natural Gas Pipeline.  A subsidiary company, North West Shelf Gas Pty Ltd markets the domestic gas component to customers in Western Australia through private contracts and sales to Alinta.

Engineering heritage award 
The first two phases of the project received an Engineering Heritage International Marker from Engineers Australia as part of its Engineering Heritage Recognition Program.

See also
Gorgon gas project

References

Further reading
 Trunkline : the magazine for Woodside people. Perth, W.A. Published for staff of Woodside group of companies by the Government and Public Affairs Division. Vol. 1, no. 1 (Feb. 1992)- Trunkline (Perth, W.A)

BP
BHP
Mitsui & Co.
Liquefied natural gas plants
Natural gas in Western Australia
North West Shelf
Oil fields of Australia
Pilbara
Recipients of Engineers Australia engineering heritage markers
Shell plc